John Fitzgerald and Anders Järryd were the defending champions but lost in the semifinals to Neil Broad and Gary Muller.

Todd Woodbridge and Mark Woodforde won in the final 6–7, 6–3, 6–4 against Broad and Muller.

Seeds
The top four seeded teams received byes into the second round.

Draw

Finals

Top half

Bottom half

References

External links
 1993 Stella Artois Championships Doubles Draw

Doubles